is a Japanese football club based in Kumamoto, the capital city of Kumamoto Prefecture. The club currently plays in the J2 League, Japan's 2nd tier of professional league football.

Name origin 
Roasso is a portmanteau of the Italian words rosso and asso, meaning "red ace".

History

Early years (1969–2004) 

The club was founded as the Nippon Telegraph and Telephone Public Corporation (Den-Den Kōsha, current NTT) Kumamoto Soccer Club in 1969. The club was promoted to the Kyushu Soccer League in 1983.

According to the NTT's privatization in 1985, the club was renamed as NTT Kyushu Soccer Club in 1988. During the NTT Kyushu era, the club won five Kyushu Soccer League titles and one All Japan Senior Football Championship. The club changed their name again to NTT Kumamoto Football Club in 2000.

The club changed their name to NTT West Kumamoto Football Club in 2001 as the NTT was divided into NTT East and NTT West. The club was promoted to the JFL in 2001. The NTT relinquished the ownership of the club in 2002 and community-oriented Alouette Kumamoto Football Club was born. Alouette is a French word meaning skylark, the bird of Kumamoto Prefecture. The club finished at the 17th in this season and was relegated to the Kyushu Soccer League.

Roasso Kumamoto (2005–) 
The club name was changed again to Rosso Kumamoto in 2005. Rosso means red in Italian. After they won the Kyushu Soccer League and finished at the 3rd in the Regional League play-off tournament, the club was promoted to the JFL.

The club was recently featured in J.League program to introduce the club to followers of the professional league. Rosso's second-place finish in the 2007 JFL season was enough to earn promotion into the J.League (J2 League) for the 2008 season.

The club changed their name to current Roasso Kumamoto in 2008. The previous name Rosso was a registered trademark of another company, so the club could not use it due to a risk of copyright infringement.

After 11 years spent in the J2 League, Kumamoto was relegated to the J3 League on 2018.

After three years at J3 League, Kumamoto returned to J2, after being promoted as the J3 champions on 2021, just a point ahead of Iwate Grulla Morioka in the league table.

In 2022, Kumamoto finished in 4th place with 62 points and advanced to J1 promotion/relegation playoffs after a arguably surprising performance in the 2022 J2 League. Roasso played against the 4th and 5th-placed teams of the J2 season, being them Oita Trinita and Montedio Yamagata, in matches that ended 1–1 and 2–2, respectively. As the league gave the advantage for the higher-placed team in the league standings to qualify for the next round, Roasso were able to qualify for the play-off finals, despite not winning any match. This time, Kyoto Sanga, as the J1 League team in question, earned the seeding advantage, meaning that Roasso needed to win this match in order to earn promotion. The match ended in a 1–1 draw and Roasso were not promoted for the J1.

Rivalries 
The traditional rival of Roasso Kumamoto is Kagoshima United, the prefectural neighbors and former Kyushu Soccer League fellows since 1983 until 2005, except 2001–2002. Matches between the two clubs are labelled Hisatsu derby (肥薩ダービー, "Kumamoto-Kagoshima derby") and generate a lot of interest in both prefectures.

League & cup record 

Key

Honours 

Japan Football League / J3 League  (3rd tier)
Champions (1): 2021
Runners-up (1): 2007
Kyushu Soccer League (1973–)
 Champions (7):1991, 1994, 1996, 1997, 1999, 2000, 2005
Runners-up (2): 1989, 1992
All Japan Senior Football Championship (1965–)
 Winners (2): 1998, 2005 (shared)

League history 
Regional (Kyushu): 1983–2000
Division 3 (JFL): 2001–2002
Regional (Kyushu): 2003–2005
Division 3 (JFL): 2006–2007
Division 2 (J2): 2008–2018
Division 3 (J3): 2019–2021
Division 2 (J2): 2022–

Current squad 

.

Out on loan

Coaching staff 
For the 2023 season.

Managerial history

Kit and colours

Colour, sponsors and manufacturers
Roasso Kumamoto's club colour is red, representing burning passion and desire for victory.

Kit evolution

Past seasons 
Shota Aizawa (2020)

References

External links 
 

 
Football clubs in Japan
Association football clubs established in 2004
J.League clubs
Kumamoto
Nippon Telegraph and Telephone
2004 establishments in Japan
Sports teams in Kumamoto Prefecture
Japan Football League clubs